The 2009 European Parliament election in Sweden was held on 7 June 2009 and determined the makeup of the Swedish delegation to the European Parliament.  The election was held using a modified form of the Sainte-Laguë method of party-list proportional representation using the entire country as a single electoral constituency. There is a threshold limit of 4 percent for Swedish elections to the European Parliament, so that any party not receiving at least four percent of the votes will not be allocated any seats.

Sweden will be allocated 18 seats in the European parliament for this term, a reduction from the 19 they were allocated in the 2004 election. From December 2011 Sweden has 20 seats.

The new Pirate Party polled at 7.1%, giving it one seat, and from December 2011 two seats after the Treaty of Lisbon. The eurosceptic June List saw the biggest slump in support, falling nearly 11% and losing all 3 seats.

Turnout increased compared to the last election, from 37.9% to 45.5%.

Opinion polls

* Based on delta of +0.3% in 29 May poll.

Results

The final results were published by the Swedish Election Authority on 11 June 2009. From December 2011, the Pirate Party and Swedish Social Democratic Party had one more seat each after the Treaty of Lisbon.

Municipalities

Municipalities in which European party groups received the most votes:
Greens-EFA: Lund, Gothenburg, Sundbyberg
ALDE: Sunne, Valdemarsvik, Ydre
EPP-ED: Danderyd, Vellinge, Lidingö
PES: Överkalix, Kalix, Hagfors

Votes summary

Seats summary

See also
Elections in Sweden
List of political parties in Sweden
2009 European Parliament election
Members of the European Parliament for Sweden 2009–2014

References

External links
Swedish Election Authority (English)
Swedish Election Authority: Elections in Sweden: The way it's done
List of candidates in the European Parliament election, 2009 (Sweden)
Europaparlamentets informationskontor i Sverige

Sweden
European Parliament elections in Sweden
Europe